Paul Crawford FRSA, FAcSS, FRSPH (born 1963) is an English academic and writer.

Academic career

Crawford received a first-class honours degree in English language and literature in 1994 before completing his PhD at The University of Birmingham in 1999. His thesis on the novelist William Golding was funded by the British Academy. Crawford joined The University of Nottingham in 2001 and led the development of a new research unit, the Health Language Research Group. A specialist in trans-disciplinary research related to healthcare, he went on to pioneer the new field of Health Humanities, becoming the first and only Professor of Health Humanities worldwide in 2008. He is currently Director of the Centre for Social Futures, Institute of Mental Health. He has held over £6,000,000 in research grants from the Arts and Humanities Research Council, Economic and Social Research Council and The Leverhulme Trust. In 2021 he led the What’s Up With Everyone campaign with Aardman Animations to support young people’s mental health, which won best Social Media and Content at the 2021 Design Week Awards.

Writings

Crawford has written or co-written fourteen books. His first book, Communicating Care: The Language of Nursing (Nelson Thornes, 1998) was the first volume worldwide on non-medical discourse in healthcare. His second book was the novel, Nothing Purple, Nothing Black (The Book Guild, 2002), optioned for film by British film producer, Jack Emery (The Drama House, London/Florida). His third book was a single-author monograph, Politics and History in William Golding (University of Missouri, 2003).  This major, critical work was reviewed in The Times Literary Supplement (Medcalf, 2003) and a key chapter on ‘Literature of Atrocity’ anthologized in Bloom’s Guides to Lord of the Flies (2004; 2008).  It also led to Crawford writing the entry for Golding in The Oxford Encyclopedia of British Literature (Oxford University Press, 2006). His fourth book, Evidence Based Research: Dilemmas and Debates in Healthcare (Open University Press, 2003) was Highly Commended in the British Medical Association (BMA) Book Competition for 2004. His fifth book, Storytelling in Therapy (Nelson Thornes, 2004) explores the use of short stories in Cognitive Behavioural Therapy.  His sixth book, Communication in Clinical Settings (Nelson Thornes, 2006) offers a new model for health communication (Brief, Ordinary and Effective Model).  His seventh book, Evidence-based Health Communication (Open University Press, 2006) advances the case for health communication research and data-driven learning. His eighth book is Madness in Post-1945 British and American Fiction (Palgrave Macmillan, London, 2010). His ninth book, Health Humanities (Palgrave Macmillan, London, 2015), builds on Crawford's seminal paper that first defined the field in 2010. His tenth book, Humiliation: Mental Health and Public Shame (Emerald, Bingley, 2019), shows how humiliation can provoke violence and aggression. His eleventh book, The Routledge Companion to Health Humanities (Routledge, London, 2020), features 65 chapters from 83 scholars worldwide and advances new perspectives on theories and applications in this field. His twelfth book, Florence Nightingale at Home (Palgrave, 2020), accounts for how the material and conceptual notions of domestic life impacted on this great Victorian woman's ideas and work. Florence Nightingale at Home received a Best Achievement award from the People's Book Prize in 2022. His thirteenth book, Cabin Fever: Surviving Lockdown in the Coronavirus Pandemic (Emerald, 2021), presents a social and cultural history of cabin fever on land, at sea, in the air, and in space. Crawford is also Commissioning Editor for the Arts for Health Series (Emerald, Bingley, 2020) and Editor-in-Chief (with Paul Kadetz) for The Encyclopedia of Health Humanities (Springer Nature, New York, forthcoming, 2021). Crawford's fourteenth book, Mental Health Literacy and Young People (Emerald, 2022), provides an accessible entry point to mental health literacy and young people at a time of unprecedented challenges.

Radio

Crawford has appeared on major radio shows, such as the Today programme and Woman's Hour on BBC Radio 4, to discuss issues related to mental health, religion, and creative writing.

References

1963 births
Living people
Academics of the University of Nottingham
Alumni of the University of Birmingham
BBC radio presenters
Fellows of the Academy of Social Sciences